The Felicity Party (SP) is an Islamist Turkish political party. It was founded in 2001, and mainly supported by conservative Muslims in Turkey.

It was founded on 20 July 2001 after the Virtue Party (FP) was banned by the Constitutional Court.  While the party's reformist wing formed the Justice and Development Party (AKP), the hardliners founded the Felicity Party.  Although an Islamist party, its policy platform covers the whole span of political issues in Turkey.

The Felicity Party's vote has been weakened by the success of the moderately Islamic Justice and Development Party government. It has repeatedly condemned the Turkish government's desire to join the European Union, and relationship with Israel and the United States.  It has argued that Turkey must adapt its military and foreign policy stance to meet what it argues are increasing threats coming from the West to all Muslim countries. The Party's platform is based strongly around Necmettin Erbakan's ideas and philosophy.

The Felicity Party works both as a political party and an enormous social organization. It has party branches in nearly every district, small town and city in the country. In the past it has organized demonstrations on a wide range of issues, often involving tens of thousands of participants. Thousands of protesters joined SP organized demonstrations against the 2004 attack on Fallujah, against the cartoons of Muhammad in newspapers around the world, and most recently against Israel's invasion of Gaza during the 2008–2009 Israel–Gaza conflict.

Electoral results
The Felicity Party has not been particularly successful electorally, polling just 2.5% of the vote in the 2002 general elections, thereby failing to pass the 10% threshold necessary to gain representation in the Turkish Grand National Assembly.  It was slightly more successful in the local elections of 29 March 2004, winning 4.1% of the vote and a number of mayoralties, although none of any particular significance. In the 2011 election they were reduced to 1.24% on the vote. During the period, Recai Kutan (20 July 2001 – 11 May 2003 and again 30 January 2004 – 29 March 2008), Necmettin Erbakan (11 May 2003 – 30 January 2004 and again from 17 October 2010 till his death on 27 February 2011) and Numan Kurtulmuş (26 October 2008 – 1 October 2010) were leaders. In June 2015 elections it won 2.06% of the votes.

National Alliance (2015)
In preparation for the June 2015 general election, the Felicity Party stated that it was open to negotiate an electoral alliance with other parties such as the Great Union Party (BBP) and the larger Nationalist Movement Party (MHP). Although the MHP later announced that it was not willing to form an electoral alliance, the SP and BBP agreed upon a new alliance in order to increase their chances of surpassing the election threshold of 10% to gain representation in Parliament. The new alliance was named the National Alliance (Millî İttifak).

The Nation and Justice Party (MİLAD) also expressed their intention to join the alliance, but when they were only given top spots on the candidate lists in only 4 electoral districts, MİLAD withdrew and was unable to contest the election for not sending their own party lists to the Supreme Electoral Council on time.

The candidate lists were drawn up such that BBP candidates were placed top in electoral districts in which they won more votes than the SP in 2011, while SP candidates were placed top in provinces in which the SP had beaten the BBP in 2011. This meant that an SP candidate was placed first in 55 provinces, while a BBP candidate was placed first in 30. The remaining positions subsequently alternated between SP and BBP candidates. SP leader Mustafa Kamalak was selected as the first candidate for İstanbul's 1st electoral district while BBP leader Mustafa Destici was selected as the first candidate for Ankara's 2nd electoral district.

Nation Alliance (2018) 
The party participated in the Nation Alliance in the 2018 general elections with the Republican People's Party (CHP), Good Party (İYİ), and Democrat Party (DP).

In 2022, the party took part in the establishment of the Table of Six.

Party leaders

References

External links
Official home page 
English pages

2001 establishments in Turkey
Eurosceptic parties in Turkey
Far-right political parties in Turkey
Islamic political parties in Turkey
Political parties established in 2001
Political parties in Turkey
Islamic nationalism
Social conservative parties